Huitong railway station is a fourth-class railway station in Huitong County, Huaihua, Hunan.

References 

Railway stations in Hunan
Railway stations in Huaihua